Reichardt's dye (Betaine 30) is an organic dye belonging to the class of azomerocyanine betaines. This dye is notable for its solvatochromic properties, meaning it changes color depending on the solvent in which it is dissolved. It has one of the largest solvatochromic effects ever observed, with color varying across the entire visible spectrum. As a result, it gives striking visual results for chemical demonstrations.

It is thus also sometimes called Dimroth–Reichardt dye. The names also sometimes refer to some close chemical analogs, in particular, the one having para substituted tert-butyl groups on the phenyl rings.

Synthesis 

A newer synthesis is:

2,6-Diphenylphenol is nitrated with diluted nitric acid to 4-nitro-2,6-diphenylphenol and subsequently reduced with sodium dithionite to the amine. This is reacted in presence of sodium acetate in ethanol with 2,4,6-triphenylpyryliumhydrogensulfate to the hydrogen sulfate of the dye and the betaine is formed by adding sodium hydroxide.

References 

Fluorescent dyes
Pyridinium compounds
Phenolates